Armourstone is a generic term for broken stone with stone masses between  (very coarse aggregate) that is suitable for use in hydraulic engineering. Dimensions and characteristics are laid down in European Standard EN13383.

Stone classes

Armourstone is available in standardised stone classes, which are described by a lower and an upper value of the stone mass in these classes. The standard also gives values that cannot be exceeded by 5% or 3%.

For specific use as a top layer for a breakwater or bank protection, the size of the median stone mass, the M50, is often required. This is a category A stone. This does not apply to category B stone. There are two groups, divided into classes HM and LM (Heavy and Light). Thus, a stone class is defined according to EN 13383 as, for example, HMA300-1000. Attached graphs give an overview of all stone classes. Any distribution between the two indicated curves meets the requirements for category B; In addition, in order to comply with category A, the MEM must pass through the small horizontal line. MEM is the mean stone mass, i.e. the total mass of the sample divided by the number of stones in the sample. Note that for wide ranges (especially the range 15 - 300 and 40 - 400 there is quite some difference, for the 15-300 class the M50= 1.57 times MEM).

In addition, a stone class CP (Coarse) has been defined. The class CP is smaller than LM, although the name suggests otherwise. This is because this class is identical to the coarse class in the standard for fractional stone as a supplemental material (aggregate). In the stone class CP, the class is not indicated by kg, but in mm. On the basis of the basic information from standard EN13383, the following table can be drawn up:

Median stone mass M50

For fine-grained materials such as sand, the size is usually given by the median diameter, which is determined by sieving the sand. It is not possible to make a sieve curve for armourstone, the stones are too large to sieve. This is why the M50 is used. This is determined by taking a sample of stones, then determining the mass of each stone, sorting these masses by size, and making a cumulative mass curve. In this curve you can read the M50. Note that the term median stone mass is factually incorrect, it is not true that the stone with mass M50 is also the middle stone of the sample.

As an example, a sample of 50 stones from a quarry in Bulgaria. The blue rectangle has size A4. All stones are individually weighed, and their mass is plotted in attached graph. Horizontal is the individual stone mass, and vertically the cumulative mass as a percentage of the total mass of the sample. At 50% the M50 can be read, this is 24kg. The real median of this sample is the average mass of stone 25 + 26. In this particular example the M50 is accidentally nearly equal to the median mass (26kg). This sample satisfies the requirements for LMA5-40 (apart from the fact that the sample is too small, according to EN13383 such a sample must consist of at least 200 stones).

Nominal diameter
Since many design formulas do not contain a stone mass but a diameter, it is necessary to establish a conversion method. This is the nominal diameter, this is the size of a rib of a cube with the same weight as the stone, so
 
Usually the median value is also used for this: dn50. In general, the relation can be used for conversion: 
 
where Fs is the shape factor. By the way, the shape factor varies quite a bit, the range is between 0.7 and 0.9.

For the above example from Bulgaria, the dn50 has also been determined. Since the density of the local stone (a limestone) is 2284 kg/m³, the dn50 is 22 cm. Notice that the sample’s stone size appears to be much larger visually. That’s because there’s a couple of big stones in it that gives a wrong impression.

Other parameters
Standard EN13383 describes many more parameters that capture the quality of armourstone, such as a shape parameter (Length/Thickness), resistance to breakage, water absorption capacity etc. It is important to realise that the standard indicates how to define the quality of armourstone, but not what quality is required for a particular application. The latter is contained in design manuals and design guidelines, such as the Rock Manual.

Determination of required stone weight
To calculate the required weight under the influence of waves, the (outdated) Hudson Formula or the Van der Meer formula can be used. For calculation of the stone weight in flow, the Izbash formula is recommended.

References

Hydraulic engineering